The Queensland Academy of Sport Men's Football Program is run by the Queensland Academy of Sport for the state's elite youth football players. The QAS runs this program for both men and women.

Players

Notable former players

External links
 QSL profile
 QAS Athletes' profiles

National Premier Leagues clubs
Queensland State League soccer teams
Association football clubs established in 1991
1991 establishments in Australia
Women's soccer clubs in Australia